Marianne Apostolides is a Canadian novelist and memoirist. She is best known for her 2009 novel Swim, whose French-language translation by Madeleine Stratford was shortlisted for the Governor General's Award for English to French translation at the 2016 Governor General's Awards, and her 2012 memoir Voluptuous Pleasure: The Truth About the Writing Life, which was named one of the 100 best books of the year by The Globe and Mail.

Works
Inner Hunger: A Young Woman's Struggle Through Anorexia and Bulimia (1998)
Swim (2009)
The Lucky Child (2010)
Voluptuous Pleasure: The Truth About the Writing Life (2012)
Sophrosyne (2014)
Deep Salt Water (2017)
I Can't Get You Out of My Mind (2020)

References

External links

Canadian people of Greek descent
21st-century Canadian novelists
Canadian women novelists
Canadian memoirists
Living people
21st-century Canadian women writers
Canadian women memoirists
Year of birth missing (living people)
21st-century memoirists